The Open de Sevilla was a golf tournament on the European Tour that was played only once, in 2004. It was held at Real Club de Golf de Sevilla, in Seville, Spain. It was won by Argentina's Ricardo González, who finished two strokes ahead of Jonathan Lomas and Stephen Gallacher.

Winners

References

External links
Coverage on the European Tour's official site

Former European Tour events
Golf tournaments in Spain